Events from the year 1226 in Ireland.

Incumbent
Lord: Henry III

Events
Castle built at Castleisland, County Kerry, by Geoffrey Maurice (or de Marisco), Lord Justice of Ireland.

Births

Deaths
 Walter de Riddlesford, Norman lord with lands in County Wicklow and County Kildare.
 Nuala Ní Conchobair, Queen of Ulaid.

References

 
1220s in Ireland
Ireland
Years of the 13th century in Ireland